Rev. Walter Angus Elmslie (1856-1935) was a Scottish missionary of the Livingstonia Mission in Malawi and associate of Robert Laws.

Works
Among the Wild Ngoni
Table of Concords and Paradigm of Verb of the Ngoni Language  1891 
How Came our Faith - dealing with the life and work of seven Old Testament prophets

References

1856 births
1935 deaths